Powiat nowodworski (disambiguation)

Surname
 Adam Nowodworski (1572–1634) was a Roman Catholic Polish bishop.
 Michał Nowodworski (1831–1896) was a 19th-century Roman Catholic Bishop of Plock in Poland.

See also
 Bartłomiej Nowodworski High School
 Nowodworski Foundation
 Wólka Nowodworska
 Valeriya Novodvorskaya